Eric Gérard Carrière (born 24 May 1973) is a French former professional footballer who played as a midfielder for Nantes, Lyon, Lens, and Dijon.

Club career
Carrière started his professional career at FC Nantes with whom he won his first Ligue 1 title in 2001. In 2001, he moved to Olympique Lyonnais where he won three more Ligue 1 titles in 2002, 2003 and 2004. In 2004 he signed with RC Lens. After Lens suffered relegation, he played for Dijon FCO after signing a two-year contract on 26 June 2008.

International career
Carrière was capped ten times and scored five goals for the France national team. He gained his first international cap on 30 March 2001 in a 5–0 win over South Korea at Daegu Stadium during the 2001 FIFA Confederations Cup.

Style of play
Carrière was a skilful playmaker who was adept at taking free-kicks, penalties, and corners for his team, as well as scoring from the run of play, although he was primarily known for defence splitting passes.

Honours
Nantes
Division 1: 2000–01
Coupe de France: 1998–99, 1999–2000
Trophée des Champions: 1999

Lyon
Division/Ligue 1: 2001–02, 2002–03, 2003–04
Trophée des Champions: 2002, 2003

Lens
UEFA Intertoto Cup: 2005

France
FIFA Confederations Cup: 2001

Individual
Division 1 Player of the Year: 2001
FIFA Confederations Cup Silver Shoe: 2001

References

External links

 
 

1973 births
Living people
People from Foix
Sportspeople from Ariège (department)
French footballers
France international footballers
Association football midfielders
FC Nantes players
Olympique Lyonnais players
RC Lens players
Dijon FCO players
Ligue 1 players
2001 FIFA Confederations Cup players
FIFA Confederations Cup-winning players
Footballers from Occitania (administrative region)